Alphonsea zeylanica is a species of plant in the Annonaceae family. It is endemic to Sri Lanka.

Trunk
Bark - smooth, gray.

Flowers
Inflorescence - sessile, pubescent.

References

zeylanica
Endemic flora of Sri Lanka
Least concern biota of Asia
Least concern plants
Taxa named by Joseph Dalton Hooker